Andalus may refer to:

Places
 Al-Andalus, a historical region in Europe around the Iberian Peninsula
 Andalusia, a modern-day Spanish autonomous community
 Al Andalus (Kuwait), a suburb of Kuwait City
Al Andalus mall, a shopping mall in Jeddah, Saudi Arabia

Other uses
 Al-Andalus Ensemble, an American world music group
 Al Andalus Tobruk, a Libyan football (soccer) club
 Andalus Airlines, a former Spanish airline

See also 
 Andalusia (disambiguation)